This is a list of Gujarati language films that are released or scheduled to release in 2023.

Box-office collection

January–March

April–June

July–September

References

External links 

2023
Gujarati
Gujarati